Leemans is a Dutch occupational surname derived from leenman, a feudal tenant or vassal. It is particularly common in Flanders. People with this surname include:

 Anthonie Leemans (1631–1673), Dutch still life painter, brother of Johannes
 Egide François Leemans (1839–1883). Belgian painter, draughtsman and engraver
 Fernand Leemans (born 1925), Belgian figure skater
 Jo Leemans (born 1927), Belgian singer
 Johannes Leemans (1633–1688), Dutch still life painter and wine dealer, brother of Anthonie
 Ken Leemans (born 1983), Belgian footballer
 Kimberly Leemans, a U.S. model
  (1961), Belgian trade unionist
 Pieter Leemans (1897–1980), Belgian classical musician and composer
 Tuffy Leemans (1912–1979), American football player
 Victor Leemans (1901–1971), Belgian (Flemish) sociologist and politician
  (1926–1998), Belgian sociologist and politician

See also 
 Leeman (disambiguation)

References 

Dutch-language surnames
Occupational surnames